Trivellona finleyi is a species of small sea snail, a marine gastropod mollusk in the family Triviidae, the false cowries or trivias.

Description
The shell size varies between 12 mm and  23 mm

Distribution
This species is distributed in the Pacific Ocean along Hawaii and the Philippines

References

 Beals, M. N. (2001). A new species of Robertotrivia from the Philippines. La Conchiglia. 33(298): 20-22. 
 Fehse D. (2002) Beiträge zur Kenntnis der Triviidae (Mollusca: Gastropoda) V. Kritische Beurteilung der Genera und Beschreibung einer neuen Art der Gattung Semitrivia Cossmann, 1903. Acta Conchyliorum 6: 3-48.
 Fehse D. & Grego J. (2004) Contribution to the knowledge of the Triviidae (Mollusca: Gastropoda). IX. Revision of the genus Trivellona. Berlin and Banska Bystrica. Published as a CD in 2004; as a book in 2009

External links
 

Triviidae
Gastropods described in 2001